The Men's Triple Jump F12 had its Final held on September 8 at 9:40.

Medalists

Results

References
Final

Athletics at the 2008 Summer Paralympics